Sophia Gardens Pavilion was a performance venue located in Sophia Gardens, Cardiff, Wales. It was built in 1951 for the Festival of Britain and was the boxing and wrestling venue for the 1958 British Empire and Commonwealth Games.

History

The pavilion was built in 1951 for the Festival of Britain. Due to government restrictions on building materials during the post-war period, the framework of the building was adapted from a surplus aircraft hangar from RAF Stormy Down near Bridgend.

The building was host to many concerts, but during January 1982 the roof collapsed due to an estimated  of snow, and the building was subsequently demolished. Just one month before the collapse, Cardiff Council had approved an extensive improvement programme, which would have cost approximately £100,000.

The pavilion was used for the boxing and wrestling competitions of the 1958 British Empire and Commonwealth Games.

Many notable performers played at the pavilion, including Danny Kaye, Cliff Richard, Jimi Hendrix, Pink Floyd and Slade.

See also

List of Commonwealth Games venues

References

External links

 Picture of Sophia Gardens Pavilion c. 1960
 Fashion Show In Cardiff Aka Berketex Fashions 1952 film clip showing the interior of the pavilion

Former music venues in Cardiff
Music venues completed in 1951
Demolished buildings and structures in Wales
World's fair architecture in the United Kingdom
Commonwealth Games wrestling venues
Building collapses in the United Kingdom
History of Cardiff
Buildings and structures demolished in 1982
1982 in Wales
1982 disasters in the United Kingdom